The Benham was an automobile manufactured in Detroit, Michigan, by the Benham Manufacturing Company from 1914 to 1917.  Approximately 60 units were produced.  Benham Manufacturing was the successor to the S&M (Strobel & Martin).  The Benham had a Continental engine.

References
 

Defunct motor vehicle manufacturers of the United States
Motor vehicle manufacturers based in Michigan
Defunct companies based in Michigan
Companies based in Detroit